Erath is a town in Vermilion Parish, Louisiana, United States. The population was 2,114 at the 2010 census, and 2,030 at the 2020 population estimates program. It is part of the Abbeville micropolitan statistical area and the Lafayette metropolitan area.

History
Erath is named after August Erath (18 March 1843 - 11 September 1900) who emigrated from Switzerland to New Orleans in 1860 and was a bookkeeper in the breweries. He moved to New Iberia in 1876 and erected a brewery there. Erath was later mayor of New Iberia and began to develop land in the Erath area. Although August Erath never lived in Erath, he was close to railroad officials, which brought forth a great business venture for him.  Later, Erath built a seltzer water factory in New Iberia and an ice plant in Abbeville. In 1884, he started a hardware business and purchased land located in this area.

In 2005, storm surge forced inland by Hurricane Rita flooded most of the town. Water in most parts of town was up to six feet deep.

Geography
Erath is located at  (29.959939, -92.035220).

The eastern edge of Erath borders with the town of Delcambre on LA-14.

Demographics

At the 2000 United States census, there were 2,187 people, 819 households, and 580 families residing in the town. The racial makeup of the town was 89.12% White, 6.22% African American, 0.18% Native American, 3.52% Asian, 0.32% from other races, and 0.64% from two or more race; Hispanic or Latino Americans of any race were 0.69% of the population.

By the 2020 United States census, there were 2,028 people, 934 households, and 655 families residing in the town. According to the 2019 American Community Survey, the racial and ethnic makeup of the township was 89.4% non-Hispanic white, 4.0% Black and African American, 6.4% Asian alone, and 0.2% some other race; 6.6% of the population were Hispanic or Latin American of any race.

In 2000, were 819 households, out of which 35.0% had children under the age of 18 living with them, 50.7% were married couples living together, 16.1% had a female householder with no husband present, and 29.1% were non-families. 25.9% of all households were made up of individuals, and 12.5% had someone living alone who was 65 years of age or older. The average household size was 2.56 and the average family size was 3.09.

In the town, the population was spread out, with 26.2% under the age of 18, 10.2% from 18 to 24, 27.0% from 25 to 44, 19.9% from 45 to 64, and 16.6% who were 65 years of age or older. The median age was 36 years. For every 100 females, there were 83.0 males. For every 100 females age 18 and over, there were 77.2 males.

According to the 2019 American Community Survey, the median household income was $38,295, up from $27,836 at the 2000 U.S. census. Males had a median income of $54,762, up from $28,750 in 2000; females had a median income of $30,345, up from $19,118 in 2000. An estimated 16.6% of the population lived at or below the poverty line.

Economy
Erath is home to Henry Hub, an important junction of natural gas pipeline systems. Natural gas prices in North America are more or less set at this junction.

The "Henry" hub is so named for its location in the Henry hamlet of Erath, which was named after the Henry High School that stood there until damage from flooding due to Hurricane Rita forced its closure and demolition. This school was named for its benefactor, William Henry, who originally immigrated from Copenhagen, Denmark as Ludwig Wilhelm Kattentidt, circa 1840, then dropped the surname and used his father's middle 'Heinrich' for his surname of Henry. There are Henry descendants in the area to this day.

It was customary for benefactors to sponsor schools; there were quite a few similarly sponsored schools in Vermilion Parish around that time. Being that long ago and in a rural area, with schools sometimes sponsored even in homes, there was great variation in what was offered to how many, and it often changed over time. Records say that the Henry school was founded in 1877, and apparently became a high school in 1896 because it celebrated its centennial in 1996.

In 1992, the Vermilion Parish school district reorganized the schools. Students transferred to Erath High, and Henry High became an elementary school. Then on September 24, 2005 (less than a month after Hurricane Katrina), Hurricane Rita smashed the parish and ruined the school. The area was also hit hard three years later by Hurricane Ike, and the main building was finally razed around March 2009. Likewise, St. John Catholic Church across the street had its rectory damaged; it is being replaced with a new building elevated to meet new flood standards as of early 2014.

When land for the Henry school was bequeathed, it was stipulated for education into perpetuity, or to be returned to the heirs.  The gymnasium was salvaged and is still used by the school district to this day. A Google Earth comparison of, for example, Feb. 28, 2006 to April 23, 2012, at the intersection of Highways 330 and 689 shows a parking lot where the main school was, and the church's rectory gone, but the gymnasium in clear use by child sports organizations and other groups.

Notable people
 Dudley J. LeBlanc, served in legislature and ran for governor on three occasions
 Doris Leon "D. L." Menard, songwriter, performer, and recording artist 
 Randy Romero, Thoroughbred Racing Hall of Fame jockey
 Roy R. Theriot, mayor of Abbeville and Louisiana state comptroller
 Elijah Mitchell, a professional football player NFL Running Back for the San Francisco 49ers.

References

External links
 The Acadian Museum
 Vermilion Parish Tourist Commission
 Vermilion Historical Society

Acadiana
Towns in Louisiana
Towns in Vermilion Parish, Louisiana